Martin Schultz House is a historic home located at Hallam, York County, Pennsylvania. It was built about 1736, and is a -story, rectangular blue limestone early Germanic dwelling built into a hillside. It measures 30 feet by 50 feet and has a steeply pitched roof with gable dormers.  It was restored between 1956 and 1960.

It was added to the National Register of Historic Places in 1993.

References

External links
Martin Schultz House, Emig Street, near Hellam Street, Hallam, York County, PA: 7 photos, 2 data pages, and 1 photo caption page, at Historic American Buildings Survey

Historic American Buildings Survey in Pennsylvania
Houses on the National Register of Historic Places in Pennsylvania
Houses completed in 1736
Houses in York County, Pennsylvania
National Register of Historic Places in York County, Pennsylvania